The Dilys Breese Medal is a medal awarded by the British Trust for Ornithology to recognise communicators who help to deliver ornithological science to new audiences. It is named in memory of film maker Dilys Breese, who died in 2007, and was inaugurated in 2009, funded by a bequest from Breese. The medal features a design by Robert Gillmor, showing a robin in front of a TV screen.

The inaugural awards were made in November 2009, to six recipients at a ceremony at the House of Lords.

Dilys Breese Medallists
Source: British Trust for Ornithology

See also

 List of ornithology awards

References

External links 
Past medallists

Ornithology awards
British Trust for Ornithology
2009 establishments in the United Kingdom
Awards established in 2009